Adıyaman is a city in southeastern Turkey. It is the administrative centre of Adıyaman Province and Adıyaman District. Its population is 267,131 (2021). The inhabitants of the city are mostly Kurdish.

The city was one of the worst affected by the February 2023 Turkey-Syria earthquakes. Many buildings were destroyed and many lives lost in part because bad weather and damage to the transport infrastructure delayed the arrival of rescue teams.

Etymology
An unverified theory is that the former name of the city Hisn-Mansur derives from the name of the Umayyad Emir Mansur ibn Jawana who was killed by the Abbasid Caliph Al-Mansur in this region in 758. Because of the difficulty among the locals in pronouncing Hisn-Mansur, the corruption Semsur emerged.

Various unverifiable theories exist for the name.

Places of interest

There is some passing tourist trade, the main tourist attraction being Mount Nemrut.
These have been used as a burial ground for thousands of years. The sights include the ruins of the city and burial caves carved into the rock.
 The only active church in Adıyaman Province is located here, where it is the center of the Syriac Orthodox patriarchal vicarate of Adıyaman. It was renovated and reopened in 2012.

Climate 
Adıyaman has a hot summer Mediterranean climate (Csa) under both the Köppen and Trewartha classifications, with some continental characteristics. Summers are very hot and very dry. Temperatures often reach  at the height of summer. Winters in Adıyaman are cool to cold with heavy precipitation. Due to its inland location and relatively high altitude, frost and snow are common.

Neighbourhoods
The city has 33 quarters, including Esentepe.

See also
 Anatolian Tigers
 Reşwan (tribe)
 Commagene
 Çiğ köfte

References

 
Ancient Greek archaeological sites in Turkey
Roman sites in Turkey
Populated places in Adıyaman Province
Adıyaman District
Cities in Turkey
Turkish Kurdistan
Kurdish settlements in Adıyaman Province